Alain-Pierre Mendy (born 17 November 1989) is a Senegalese professional footballer who plays as a central midfielder for French club La Roche VF.

Biography
Born in Dakar, Senegal, Mendy started his professional career in Italy. He was a member of Mantova's Primavera under-20 team in 2008–09 season. He played his first professional game in the Serie B on 16 May 2009 against Empoli, coming off the bench in the 77th minute for Mattia Marchesetti. He then remained in Primavera as an overage player. After Mantova finished in 20th place, was relegated and suffered bankruptcy, Mendy was released.

Mendy was without a club for on season. It was due to FIGC allowed non-EU players to join youth teams if they joined Italy with reason other than football, they were not allowed to play as a professional player in Italy. He trialled at Nocerina in July 2010.

On 5 August 2011, he was signed by Serie A club Parma and left for Pro Vercelli along with Angelo Bencivenga. However the deal collapsed. On 19 August he left for fellow top division club A.S. Roma for €150,000 on a one-year contract. On 26 August he was sold to Brussels on free transfer, along with Parma two weeks "teammate" Sulaiman Sesay Fullah, who was also unable to register in Italy. The transaction also allowed Roma to fulfil the non-EU registration quota.

After one season at Brussels, he moved to newly promoted Waasland-Beveren.

References

External links
 
 

Living people
1989 births
Footballers from Dakar
Association football midfielders
Senegalese footballers
Mantova 1911 players
Parma Calcio 1913 players
US Gorée players
R.W.D.M. Brussels F.C. players
S.K. Beveren players
La Roche VF players
Serie B players
Belgian Pro League players
Challenger Pro League players
Championnat National 3 players
Senegalese expatriate footballers
Senegalese expatriate sportspeople in Italy
Expatriate footballers in Italy
Senegalese expatriate sportspeople in Belgium
Expatriate footballers in Belgium